Andrzej Biegalski (5 March 1953 – 14 March 2017) was a Polish heavyweight amateur boxing champion. He reached the  quarterfinal round in the World Championships in Havana, 1974.

Biegalski's greatest success came with gold in European Championship in Katowice, Poland, June 1975 when he beat Peter Hussing from Germany by a heavy KO. However, he was not able to follow that success with more achievement due to overexploitation.  During 1976 Summer Olympics, he lost his first bout to John Tate. He also participated in the European Championship in 1979.

Biegalski was a three time national champion in 1974 and in 1978 in a heavyweight division, and in 1979 in a superheavyweight competition.

Later in life he was also involved in politics.

1976 Olympic results
Below is the record of Andrzej Biegalski, a Polish heavyweight boxer who competed at the 1976 Montreal Olympics:

 Round of 32: bye
 Round of 16: lost to John Tate (United States) by decision, 0-5

References

1953 births
2017 deaths
People from Lwówek Śląski County
Heavyweight boxers
Olympic boxers of Poland
Boxers at the 1976 Summer Olympics
Sportspeople from Lower Silesian Voivodeship
Polish male boxers
20th-century Polish people
21st-century Polish people